Estonian Equestrian Federation (abbreviation EEF) is one of the sport governing bodies in Estonia which deals with equestrian sport.

EEF was established in 1922. On 12 December 1990, EEF is re-established. EEF is a member of International Federation for Equestrian Sports  (FEI).

References

External links
 

Sports governing bodies in Estonia
Equestrian sports in Estonia
1922 establishments in Estonia
Sports organizations established in 1922